Orphanostigma excisa is a moth in the family Crambidae. It was described by Edward L. Martin in 1956. It is found in Burundi, Cameroon, Malawi and Mozambique.

References

Moths described in 1956
Spilomelinae
Moths of Sub-Saharan Africa